Derevenka is a rural locality (a village) in Teplogorskoye Rural Settlement, Velikoustyugsky District, Vologda Oblast, Russia. The population was 4 as of 2002.

Geography 
The distance to Veliky Ustyug is 65 km, to Teplogorye is 5 km. Yeremeyevo is the nearest rural locality.

References 

Rural localities in Velikoustyugsky District